is a fifteen-minute Japanese animated short film released on January 3, 2006. It was written and directed by Hayao Miyazaki for anime production house Studio Ghibli. It can be seen at the Ghibli Museum in Mitaka, Tokyo, Japan.

Synopsis
It is based in part on "Boro, the Caterpillar", a story idea which Hayao Miyazaki considered working on prior to the start of production on Princess Mononoke. The short film's main character is a diving bell spider who has fallen in love with a water strider. Although she is scared of him at first, the water strider soon gets used to the presence of the spider.

Technical specifications
The short film has an aspect ratio of 1.85:1.

See also
 
 Mizugumo

References

External links
 
 
 

2006 anime films
2000s adventure films
2000s animated short films
Anime short films
Films directed by Hayao Miyazaki
2000s Japanese-language films
Studio Ghibli animated films